Living in Fear is the second and final studio album from the supergroup The Power Station, released in 1996.

Background
In the pre-recording stage of the album, the band had the same lineup as for their previous album in 1985 (Robert Palmer, Andy Taylor, John Taylor and Tony Thompson), and all four musicians worked on the writing and arranging of the songs.  However, John Taylor was going through a divorce at the time, as well as entering drug rehab, and pulled out before the album was recorded. Instead Bernard Edwards, the producer, played all bass parts on Living In Fear, and took over as the group's official fourth member. John Taylor still receives writing and arranging credits on the finished album, but does not play on it, and is not listed as a group member.

Unfortunately, Edwards died of pneumonia in Japan before the album was released; the album is dedicated to his memory. These two events did not help the album and it was not a commercial success, with only one single, "She Can Rock It", being released.

The band, now officially a trio, toured in support of the album in 1996, with Guy Pratt (bass) and Luke Morley of Thunder (additional guitar) along as session musicians. The set-list contained a mix of Palmer, Chic, old and new Power Station songs.

Track listing
All songs written by Robert Palmer, Andy Taylor, John Taylor and Tony Thompson, except where noted.
"Notoriety" – 5:06
"Scared" – 4:06
"She Can Rock It" – 4:16
"Let's Get It On" (Marvin Gaye, Ed Townsend) – 7:03
"Life Forces" – 4:08
"Fancy That" – 3:41
"Living in Fear" – 4:37
"Shut Up" – 4:12
"Dope" – 2:53
"Love Conquers All" – 4:30
"Taxman" (George Harrison) – 3:51

Note: the US release has "Power Trippin'" as track 4 and removes "Let's Get It On". 
It also has a dark blue sleeve in comparison to the pink European and Japanese releases.

Japan version
This edition features two bonus tracks, "Power Trippin'" and "Charanga", previously released on the "She Can Rock It" CD single.
"Notoriety" – 5:06
"Scared" – 4:06
"She Can Rock It" – 4:16
"Let's Get It On" (Marvin Gaye, Ed Townsend) – 7:03
"Life Forces" – 4:08
"Fancy That" – 3:41
"Living in Fear" – 4:37
"Shut Up" – 4:12
"Dope" – 2:53
"Love Conquers All" – 4:30
"Taxman" (George Harrison) – 3:51
"Charanga" – 6:01 (bonus track)
"Power Trippin'" – 4:21 (bonus track)

Personnel
Robert Palmer – vocals, keyboards
Andy Taylor – guitar
Bernard Edwards – bass
Tony Thompson – drums
José Rossy – percussion
Wally Badarou – keyboards
Philippe Saisse – keyboards
Lenny Pickett – horns
Earl Gardner – horns
Alex Foster – horns
Mark J. Suozzo – horns
Joseph Gollehon – horns

References 

1996 albums
The Power Station (band) albums
Albums produced by Bernard Edwards
Capitol Records albums
Chrysalis Records albums